Lieutenant General Gurmit Singh  (born 1 February 1956) is a former Deputy Chief of the Indian Army. In 2021 he was appointed Governor of Uttarakhand.

Singh retired on 31 January 2016 after nearly four decades in the army, where he was deputy chief of Army Staff, and adjutant general and corps commander of strategic XV Corps that overlooks the Line of Control in Kashmir. He has also worked in border issues and counter-terrorism.

Life and career

Personal Life and Education 
Singh was born on 1 February 1956 in Jalal Usman, Amritsar, Punjab. His father served in the Indian Army and his elder brother served in Indian Air Force.

He graduated from the Defence Services Staff Course and National Defence College, has two M.Phil degrees from Chennai and Indore universities, and was a research fellow for two years on the India-China Boundary issue at the Institute of Chinese Studies, Jawaharlal Nehru University during his study leave from the Indian Army.

Military career 
After being an Infantry Company Commander, and Brigade Commander  become Brigadier General of Army Staff, he became a Major General, Additional Director General of Military Operations and Deputy Chief of Army Staff. During his stint in the Army, he was a part of numerous expert groups, joint working groups, annual dialogues and China study group meetings for over a decade. He also served in Banbasa, Uttarakhand, while in the army.

Honours 
Singh received four Presidential Awards and two commendations by the Chief of Army Staff while in the Army. He has also received  the Param Vishisht Seva Medal, Uttam Yudh Seva Medal, Ati Vishisht Seva Medal and Vishisht Seva Medal.

References

External links 
 

Living people
Governors of Uttarakhand
People from Bihar
Indian Sikhs
People from Punjab, India
Indian Army officers
Indian generals
Recipients of the Param Vishisht Seva Medal
Recipients of the Uttam Yudh Seva Medal
Recipients of the Ati Vishisht Seva Medal
Recipients of the Vishisht Seva Medal
1956 births
Defence Services Staff College alumni